Big Sandy is a town in Chouteau County, Montana, United States. The population was 605 at the 2020 census. Big Bud 747, the largest farm tractor in the world, was located here from 1997 until 2009, and returned in 2020. The Lewis and Clark Trail, following U.S. Route 87, goes through Big Sandy and in 2011 the town was named in a list of "Most Livable Small Towns" by Montana Outdoors magazine. Big Sandy, Montana also was the home of Pearl Jam bassist Jeff Ament, who built Big Sandy a skatepark.

History
At one time the site of a saloon that served Missouri River freighters, the community of Big Sandy is named for nearby Big Sandy Creek. The town began in 1887 with the arrival of the St. Paul, Minneapolis & Manitoba Railway (later the Great Northern Railway). By early 1900, Cornelius J. McNamara and Thomas A. Marlow, owners of the McNamara Cattle Company, had opened the town's first store. Homesteaders began arriving in Big Sandy in 1909, and an influx continued for a decade. Several stories explain the creek's name. The most colorful involves a muleskinner, “Big Sandy” Lane, who arrived one day near the present townsite and, to his dismay, discovered the creek at flood stage. He cursed the uncooperative weather, his bad luck, and the flooded creek crossing so fluently that the offending stream dried up immediately and he was able to cross.  For decades Big Sandy's primary landmark was the town water tower, which was visible for many miles.  The water tower was dismantled in 1993.  As of 2019 some local and former residents have banded together to establish a particularly charismatic and recurring puddle on Main Street (which has been dubbed, simply, "Puddle") as a new and recognizable landmark of the municipality.  Two of the higher profile natives of Big Sandy, Craig Edwards and Steve Sibra, are among those who actively promote "Puddle" as a body of water of consequence.

Geography
Big Sandy is located at  (48.177872, -110.114630). U.S. Route 87 cuts through town.

Climate
According to the Köppen Climate Classification system, Big Sandy has a semi-arid climate, abbreviated "BSk" on climate maps.

Demographics

2010 census
As of the census of 2010, there were 598 people, 276 households, and 161 families residing in the town. The racial makeup of the town was 93.1% White, 0.2% African American, 2.8% Native American, 0.8% Asian, 0.7% Pacific Islander, 0.3% from other races, and 2.0% from two or more races. Hispanic or Latino of any race were 1.3% of the population.

There were 276 households, of which 25.0% had children under the age of 18 living with them, 43.1% were married couples living together, 10.9% had a female householder with no husband present, 4.3% had a male householder with no wife present, and 41.7% were non-families. 39.5% of all households were made up of individuals, and 15.6% had someone living alone who was 65 years of age or older. The average household size was 2.12 and the average family size was 2.83.

The median age in the town was 47.5 years. 21.9% of residents were under the age of 18; 6.2% were between the ages of 18 and 24; 19.7% were from 25 to 44; 31.6% were from 45 to 64; and 20.6% were 65 years of age or older. The gender makeup of the town was 47.0% male and 53.0% female.

2000 census
As of the census of 2000, there were 703 people, 296 households, and 179 families residing in the town. The population density was 1,588.1 people per square mile (616.9/km2). There were 371 housing units at an average density of 838.1 per square mile (325.6/km2). The racial makeup of the town was 95.31% White, 2.84% Native American, 0.14% Pacific Islander, 0.57% from other races, and 1.14% from two or more races. Hispanic or Latino of any race were 0.71% of the population.

There were 296 households, out of which 24.3% had children under the age of 18 living with them, 49.7% were married couples living together, 8.1% had a female householder with no husband present, and 39.2% were non-families. 36.8% of all households were made up of individuals, and 19.6% had someone living alone who was 65 years of age or older. The average household size was 2.18 and the average family size was 2.83.

In the town, the population was spread out, with 21.6% under the age of 18, 5.8% from 18 to 24, 16.8% from 25 to 44, 28.7% from 45 to 64, and 27.0% who were 65 years of age or older. The median age was 48 years. For every 100 females there were 90.0 males. For every 100 females age 18 and over, there were 88.1 males.

The median income for a household in the town was $28,523, and the median income for a family was $35,417. Males had a median income of $23,000 versus $17,917 for females. The per capita income for the town was $14,801. About 10.2% of families and 14.1% of the population were below the poverty line, including 19.7% of those under age 18 and 11.0% of those age 65 or over.

Education
Big Sandy Public Schools educates students from kindergarten through 12th grade. Big Sandy High School serves the area. They are known as the Pioneers.

Choteau County Library, headquartered in Fort Benton, has a branch in Big Sandy.

Infrastructure
Big Sandy Airport is a public use airport one mile south of Big Sandy.

Notable people
 Jeff Ament of Pearl Jam was born in nearby Havre and grew up in Big Sandy. 
 Jon Tester, Democratic U.S. Senator and organic farmer
Lori Archibald Troxel, PhD, Professor of Civil Engineering at Vanderbilt University, Winner of 2020 Vanderbilt University Chancellor’s Cup.

Gallery

See also
 Big Bud 747, world's largest farm tractor
 List of cities and towns in Montana
 Cornfield Bomber, an F-106 that landed in a field near Big Sandy.

References

External links
 Town of Big Sandy
Visit MT - Big Sandy
Central Montana - Big Sandy
Big Sandy Mountaineer
Big Sandy Montana Historical Society
Montana Memory Project (Download Big Sandy High School Yearbooks)

Towns in Chouteau County, Montana
Populated places established in 1887